Metendothenia is a genus of moths belonging to the subfamily Olethreutinae of the family Tortricidae.

Species
Metendothenia albomaculata Kawabe, 1989
Metendothenia atropunctana (Zetterstedt, 1839)
Metendothenia balanacma (Meyrick, 1914)
Metendothenia calopa Diakonoff, 1973
Metendothenia emmilta Diakonoff, 1973
Metendothenia fidelis Diakonoff, 1973
Metendothenia fulvoflua Diakonoff, 1983
Metendothenia heterophenga Diakonoff, 1992
Metendothenia hilarocroca Diakonoff, 1973
Metendothenia inouei Kawabe, 1987
Metendothenia mesarotra (Meyrick, 1911)
Metendothenia ogasawarensis Kawabe & Kusui, 1978
Metendothenia plecta Diakonoff, 1983
Metendothenia pulchra Kawabe, 1989
Metendothenia rhodambon Diakonoff, 1973
Metendothenia separatana (Kearfott, 1907)

See also
List of Tortricidae genera

References

External links
tortricidae.com

Tortricidae genera
Olethreutinae
Taxa named by Alexey Diakonoff